Chino Airport  is a county-owned airport about three miles southeast of Chino, in San Bernardino County, California, United States. The Federal Aviation Administration's National Plan of Integrated Airport Systems for 2007–2011 classified it as a reliever airport, due to its proximity to the Ontario International Airport and the John Wayne Airport (in Orange County).

History
Cal-Aero Academy was an independent flying school at Chino Airport when World War II started. The U.S. Army Air Forces contracted with the school to provide basic and primary flight training for Army Air Cadets. The Abbott and Costello film Keep 'Em Flying was filmed at the base. 

During the war, Cal-Aero operated the training base with Stearmans and BT-13s. The name "Cal-Aero" is preserved at the airport and it can be seen on several buildings.

Starting in early 1945, training aircraft surplused by the cessation of pilot training programs, and post-war, hundreds of combat aircraft were flown into Chino for disposal. This agricultural area was employed as a vast parking lot for warplanes. Soon, the entire area was filled with everything from T-6s to B-24 Liberators. Most planes met an undignified end in portable smelters which were brought there to melt down the warplanes into aluminum ingots.

During the mid-1960s, the field was used as the location setting for the TV series 12 O'Clock High, as the fictitious Archbury Army Air Field, which was home base to the (equally fictitious) 918th Bomb Group. The airfield itself and a number of World War II-era buildings were used for exterior shots.

Chino Airport is the home of two aircraft museums, the Planes of Fame and the Yanks Air Museum, and the airport is one of the centers of aircraft restoration and preservation with several different companies that do this work at the airport.

Accidents and incidents
On 13 June 2013, a private jet crashed into an empty office building near a hangar. Maintenance workers were testing the jet engines when the plane jumped over the chocks and the workers lost control. Since the building was empty, no one was seriously hurt, but the jet was destroyed.

Facilities
 3/21: 4,919 x 150 ft (1,499 x 46 m)
 8L/26R: 4,858 x 150 ft (1,481 x 46 m)
 8R/26L: 7,000 x 150 ft (2,134 x 46 m)

General aviation
In the year ending March 27, 2009 the airport had 173,193 aircraft operations, average 461 per day: 99% general aviation and <1% military. 947 aircraft are based at the airport: 77 percent single-engine, 18 percent multi-engine, four percent jet, and one percent helicopter.

FBOs:
 Encore Jet Center
 Threshold Aviation Group

Airport businesses
 M.I. AIR Aviation Education – flight school
 Dubois Flight School
 Mach One Air Charters – jet charter provider with multiple FAA violations for unsafe operations

See also

 List of airports in California
 California World War II Army Airfields

References

Notes

Bibliography

 Manning, Thomas A. (2005), History of Air Education and Training Command, 1942–2002.  Office of History and Research, Headquarters, AETC, Randolph AFB, Texas 
 Shaw, Frederick J. (2004), Locating Air Force Base Sites, History’s Legacy, Air Force History and Museums Program, United States Air Force, Washington DC.

External links
 San Bernardino County Department of Airports
 The History of Cal Aero Field
 

USAAF Contract Flying School Airfields
Airfields of the United States Army Air Forces in California
Airports in San Bernardino County, California
Post-World War II aircraft storage facilities
World War II airfields in the United States